Dmitry Kawarga born in Moscow, Russia is a Russian artist. Kawarga began working in his own style of "biomorphism" striving to create a synthesis of science, art and technology. His art is featured in numerous museums and is part of the permanent collection of Erarta, Russia's largest private museum of contemporary art located in Saint Petersburg.

Style

Kawarga began his career as a painter and got his original art form among Moscow non-conformists. The flat surfaces gained more and more pronounced facture, and became ever more monumental; forms started to emerge in the manner of reliefs, and finally turned into sculptures.

Currently, he works with a wide range of polymers that serve as the material of large-scale landscape sculptures as miniature detailed compositions.

A big cycle of his works called Science Art, because in addition to the monumental sculptures and elaborate reliefs, he also produces kinetic and interactive installations, complete with biofeedback devices and robots.

His work synthesizes science, art and technology, and he often involves engineers and programmers in the creative process.

His style has been variously described as "biomorphism" or "biogenic art," while his insistence on the end of anthropocentrism has caused others to call him a practitioner of "post-human" art.

Member of a large group project in the format of the artist's book A City as an Artist's Subjectivity (2019-2020).

Permanent collections 
 KAWARGA-SKETE Gonginichy, Podporozhsky district, Leningrad region
  ARCHSTOYANIE, Nikola-Lenivets, Dzerzhinsky District, Kaluga region, Russia
  The Museum of Academician I.P. Pavlov in Koltushi
 Signet Bank
 LA Collection’ Air, Luzern, Suisse
 Sergey Kuryokhin Art Center,  St Petersburg
 ART4.RU Contemporary Art Museum, Moscow
 Erarta museum of contemporary art, St Petersburg
 Museum of Ecology and Local History, Muravlenko, Russia
 Museum Center of Krasnoyarsk, Krasnoyarsk, Russia

Gallery

Press
 theFOUND Virtual Art Center this TALK with Dmitry kawarga. 
 Interview DK with Signet private bank 
 Russian maecenas 
 Project Baltia 
 Russian Art Focus

Exhibitions
Kawarga has been a participant of international exhibitions and festivals of contemporary art, including Lexus Hybrid Art, Ars Electronica and Electronic Language International Festival,  Cyfest etc.

Solo exhibitions
 2020 - «Transport substance», The Moscow Transport Museum
 2020 - «The Athletes of Neofuturism», Art-Space KazanMall
 2020 - «The front wall was removed», Gallery of contemporary art «BizOn», Kazan
 2019 - «Norilsk's Substance», BAZIS, CENTRUL DE INTERES, Cluj-Napoca, Romania
 2019 - «Museum's line», Saint Petersburg
 2019 - «Anthropocentrism Toxicosis», Ferenczy Museum Center, Szentendre, Hungary
 2018 - «Skins of Conceptual Constructions», ELECTROMUSEUM, Moscow
 2018 - «Polymeric Offside», MUZEON - Fallen Monument Park, Moscow
 2014 - "Biomorphic dust", Saint Peterburg, RU
 2014 - "...at the deep end black fishes", The ex-cinema-theatre "Udarnik", Moscow, RU
 2012 - "Kawarga. Apocalypse 21.12", Pop/off/art Gallery, Moscow Contemporary Art Center Winzavod, Moscow, RU
 2012 - "Paleo-Geo-Morphologies", Barbarian-art Gallery, Zurich, SW
 2010 - "Topography of creative evolution", GridchinHall, Moscow Area, RU
 2010 - "Ouroboros" Gallery Brissot Art Contemporain, Paris, FR
 2009 - "Biostructures" Barbarian-art gallery, Zurich, SW
 2009 - "Coming into the theme" gallery pop/off/art, Moscow, RU
 2007-2008 - "Trepanation of the Thought-forms" gallery pop/off/art, RU
 2007 - "Photocompressing" Business house "Mohovaja, 7", Moscow, RU
 2005 - "Biomorphic radicalism in the destructive synthesis" gallery "Sam Brook", Moscow, RU
 2003 - "Retrospective Cut" Natural Science University, Moscow, RU
 2002 - "Project 2x10" Callery A-3, RU
 2001 - Science-n-Art Project in cooperation with Honored Inventor of Russia V.Beshekov
 1999 - "Saturated Landscape" Staraja Basmannja St. 21, Moscow, RU
 1998 - "Immersion into the Summer" in Moscow branch of The World Bank, RU
 1997 - "I'm bored with everyone and I'm tired." in Beljaevo Gallery, Moscow, RU
 1994 - Murals in Theatre "Perovskaja St.", Moscow, Ru
 1993 - Kashirka Gallery, Moscow, RU

Group exhibitions 
2021
 Zverev Art Prize. Exhibition of the Nominees, CCA Winzavod
 Pavlov's substance, The new anthropology and pavlov school, A permanent exhibition in Koltushi, Leningrad region

2020
 CosMoscow International Contemporary Atr Fair, Gostiny Dvor, Moscow
 «The city as subjectivity», State Museum of Urban Sculpture, St. Petersburg

2019
 THIS IS NOT A BOOK: Dmitry Volkov Collection. MMOMA
 «Plastic mass», The State Russian Museum / The Marble Palace
 «THE LOOKOUT», Contemporary Art Fest, Fort Konstantin

2018
 Breakthrough, Cultural Foundation Ekaterina
 Innovation as an Artistic Technique, Hermitage
 The RUSSIAN ART & ANTIQUE FAIR

2017
 Yearning for the Sky, Special project of Moscow Biennale
  Pieter Bruegel. Inverted world, Design center ARTPLAY, Moscow
 Exhibition of works by longlisted artists of The Kuryokhin Award, St. Petersburg
 Direct encounter, Solyanka VPA, Moscow

2016
 Martyr, Agency ArtRu, Moscow
 Contemporary Russia, The State Central Museum of Contemporary History of Russia
  Every evening before sleep, Solyanka VPA, Moscow
 Cosmoscow International Contemporary Art Fair, International Contemporary Atr Fair, Gostiny Dvor
 «Quantum Entanglement 2.0», Arsenal, Kremlin, Nizhny Novgorod
 "Archstoyanie", 11th international festival of landscape objects. Nikola-Lenivets, Dzerzhinsky District, Kaluga region, Russia.

2015
 "Orient Express", the special project of 6th Moscow Biennale, Centre MARS
 "Nadezhda – The Hope", the special project of 6th Moscow Biennale
 "Urals Transcendental", the special project of 6th Moscow Biennale, ArtPlay
 "Waxworks Exhibition", Palace of Culture Bauman Moscow State Technical University, Moscow
 "Promise of landscape", Perm Museum of Contemporary Art

2014
 "Quantum Entanglement", Laboratoria Art&Science Space and FutureEverything, Moscow
 Electronic Language International Festival, São Paulo, Brazil, (catalog)
 "Zoo-Zoo", State Darwin Museum, Moscow, (catalog)
2013
 Kandinsky Prize, The Udarnik Cinema, Moscow, (catalog)
 Open Innovations (Forum and Technology Show), Crocus Expo IEC, Moscow, (catalog)
 "Contemporary art in the Traditional Museum", The Saint Petersburg city museum festival, (catalog)
 "Total Recall – The Evolution of memory", Arselectronica, Austria, Linz, (catalog)
 "Frontier", Science-Art-Lab, Moscow
 "Goszakaz" /A Governmental Order/, Moscow Contemporary Art Center Winzavod & Pechersky Gallery
 The show of the pretenders on Sergey Kuryokhin Modern Art Award in nomination The Best Art Projects, (catalog)
2012
 "Resonant Matter", Russian Museum, Marble Palace
 "Way. Road.", Gallery ph_Manometr, ArtPlay, Moscow
 "Lexus Hybrid Art", ArtPlay, Moscow
2011
 "Free spaces", the special project of 4 Moscow Biennale, Agensy ArtRu, Moscow, (catalog)
 "Pro-Contra", International Symposium, the special project of 4 Moscow Biennale, ArtPlay, (catalog)
 "Rewriting Worlds: Dada Moscow", the special project of 4 Moscow Biennale, ArtPlay
 "ArtFocus for Technologies: Charm&Challenge", Ural forum of Industry&Innovations "INNOPROM 2011" Ekaterinburg
 "The Life. The science version", Moscow Contemporary Art Center Winzavod, Moscow, (catalog)
 "New sculpture, Chaos and Structure", New Museum, Saint Petersburg, (catalog)
 "Distortions of the Earth", Agency ArtRu, Moscow, (catalog)
2010
 Kandinsky Prize, Central House of Artists, Moscow, (catalog)
 "Club 21 - Remaking the scene", One Marylebone, the special project of Frieze Art Fair London, England, (catalog)
 "A New Formalism", Museum of a City sculpture, Saint Petersburg, (catalog)
 "Reality metamorphoses, or Games with Time", Zverev's centre of contemporary art, Moscow
 "0,5" Jubilee exhibition, gallery pop/off/art, Moscow, (catalog)
2009
 "New sculpture, Chaos and Structure", Coluyanka gallery, Moscow
 "Good News" Orel Art Gallery, London, England, (catalog)
 "Art Moscow" 13 th International Art Fair, pop/off/art gallery
 "Night of museums" Tretyakov Gallery, Moscow
 "Evolution of a dream", State Darwin Museum
 EUROP'ART'09 Grand-Saconnex Geneva, Switzerland
2008
 "Atlantis" gallery A3, Moscow
 "Invasion : Evasion" Baibakov art projects, (catalog)
 "Cyberfest" Youth Educational Centre of Hermitage Museum, Saint Petersburg
 "Power of Water" Russian Museum, Saint Petersburg, (catalog)
 "Tunguska meteorite", 100-years of falling, Krasnoyarsk
 "Art About Mortality", in memory N. Konstantinova, Rostov on Don, (catalog)
 "Sleeping district", gallery ArtMarin
2007
 Competition on the project a monument to Boris Yeltsin
 - 7th Krasnoyarsk Biennial 2007
 Work is exhibited at a show-window of a museum ART4.RU Contemporary Art Museum
1988 - 2005
 Art Manezh 2005, Moscow
 "World of War" Museum Of Decorative Art, Moscow 2003
 The Size Does Matter" Central House of Artists, Moscow 2003
 "Object and Thing" Museum Of Decorative Art, Moscow 2001
 "Action Initiation" Art Laboratory Dominanta, Moscow, 1997
 "Bleeding of Spring" Malaja Gruzinskaja, Moscow, 1997
 Art Manezh 1996, Moscow
 "Fun-Art" Central House of Artists, Moscow, 1994
 Group "Hummer" Manezh, Moscow, 1992
 "Golden Brush" Central House of Artists, Moscow, 1992
 - Malaja Gruzinskaja in Manezh, Moscow, 1991
 "Space and Spirit", Central House of Artists, Moscow, 1991 (catalog)
 Group "Hummer" Central House of Artists, Moscow, 1988
  In Memory of Pjatnitzkogo Malaja Gruzinskaja, Moscow, 1988
 "Labyrinth" Palace of Youth, Moscow, 1988

References

External links
 artsy.net
 
 pop/off/art, Moscow
 Google Gallery, Google
 RNA Foundation
 CyberArts 2013. Exhibition shows the award-winning works of the Prix Ars Electronica 2013.
 Contemporaryeasteurope, by Joel Simpson
 Erarta, Saint Petersburg, Russia, by Jeff Greif
 Zerfall und Plüschhase, by Sonja Zekri
 C-Collection
 Ouroboros: Bio-sculptures, by Galina Kabakova
 Preview Berlin
 Kawarga’s Polymer Sculptures and Model of Biomorphic Consciousness, By Joel Simpson
 Phillips London Auction
 facebook
 instagram

Living people
Russian contemporary artists
Artists from Moscow
Year of birth missing (living people)